The Kestrel Coal Mine is an underground coal mine located in the Bowen Basin at Crinum, 51 km northeast of Emerald in Central Queensland, Australia. The mine has coal reserves amounting to 158 million tonnes of coking coal, one of the largest coal reserves in Asia and the world. The mine has an annual production capacity of 4 million tonnes of coal. Both hard/semi hard coking coal and thermal coal is mined.

The mine was previously known as Gordonstone Mine. The Kestrel Mine is owned by the Kestrel Joint Venture which comprises Kestrel Coal Resources and Mitsui Kestrel Coal Investment.  The mine has been managed by Rio Tinto Coal Australia until 2018 when it was sold to Kestrel Coal Resources( a joint venture between EMR Capital and Adaro Energy).

In October 2013, the Kestrel South coal mine extension was opened.  The extension allowed for an increased production of six million tonnes a year. The mine's life was extended by 20 years.  During part of 2013 and through 2014 operations at Kestrel North were wound down.

A 7.9 km overland conveyor is used to transfer coal to a coal handling and preparation plant.  Coal is then transported by the Blackwater railway system to the Port of Gladstone for export.  Customers are mainly located in Japan, Korea, Taiwan, Europe, India and China.

Industrial dispute 
The mine was the subject of a long-running workers' strike from October 1997 to August 1999, commemorated in the heritage-listed Lilyvale Stand Monument.

See also

Coal mining in Australia
List of mines in Australia
Rio Tinto Coal Australia

References 

Coal mines in Queensland
Mines in Central Queensland
Underground mines in Australia
Mitsui
Rio Tinto (corporation)
1992 establishments in Australia
Non-renewable resource companies established in 1992